Samay (Osamayi, also Sama) is a minor Bantu language of Gabon.

References

Kele languages